Sotsialistichesky is a rural locality (a village) in Nadezhdinsky Selsoviet, Iglinsky District, Bashkortostan, Russia. The population was 46 as of 2010. There are 7 streets.

Geography 
Pyatiletka is the nearest rural locality.

References 

Rural localities in Iglinsky District